Horicon Marsh is a marsh located in northern Dodge and southern Fond du Lac counties of Wisconsin. It is the site of both a national and a state wildlife refuge. The silted-up glacial lake is the largest freshwater cattail marsh in the United States.

Geological history

Horicon Marsh was created by the Green Bay lobe of the Wisconsin glaciation during the Pleistocene era. The glacier, during its advance, created many drumlins (a glacial landform) in the region, many of which have become the islands of Horicon Marsh. The marsh and surrounding Dodge County have the highest concentration of drumlins in the world.

During the glacier's retreat, a moraine was created, forming a natural dam holding back the waters from the melting glacier and forming Glacial Lake Horicon. The Rock River slowly eroded the moraine, and the lake drained. As the levels of silt, clay and peat accumulated in the former lake's basin, the Horicon Marsh was formed.

The Horicon Marsh State Wildlife Area is one of nine units of the Ice Age National Scientific Reserve system, being considered to contain unique, representative evidence of the Ice Age of the Pleistocene era.

Inhabited history
The Horicon Marsh area has been inhabited by humans, including the Paleo-Indians, the Hopewellian people and the Mound Builders, since the ending of the last Ice Age. Dozens of 1200-year-old effigy mounds were built by the Mound Builders in the surrounding low ridges. Arrowheads have been found dating to 12,000 years ago. Later the region was inhabited by the Potawotomi, primarily to the east of the marsh, and the Ho-Chunk to the west. Seven well-traveled Native American foot trails met at the southern end of the marsh at the present location of Horicon.

When Europeans first arrived in the area, they named the marsh "The Great Marsh of the Winnebagos". The first permanent modern settlement along the marsh was the town of Horicon. In 1846, a dam was built to power the town's first sawmill. The dam held the water in the marsh, causing the water level to rise by nine feet. The "marsh" was called Lake Horicon, and was, at the time, called the largest man-made lake in the world.

In 1869, the dam was torn down by order of the State Supreme Court, which ruled in favor of landowners whose land had been flooded.  The area became a marsh once more. In 1883, two sportsmen's clubs reported huge flocks of geese in the marsh, and stated that 500,000 ducks hatched annually, and 30,000 muskrats and mink were trapped in the southern half of the marsh. Both birds and hunters flocked to the area, and the local duck population was devastated. From 1910 to 1914, an attempt was made to drain the marsh and convert it into farmland; these attempts failed, and afterwards the land was widely considered to be useless. In November 1933, an accidentally caused wildfire would destroy much of Horicon Marsh; necessitating a restoration project. It was re-opened to the public in April 1935.

Horicon National Wildlife Refuge

In 1927, the Wisconsin State Legislature, after pressure from conservationists beginning in 1921, passed the Horicon Marsh Wildlife Refuge Bill, providing for the construction of a dam to raise the water to normal levels and for the acquisition of the land by the government. During the 1940s, the United States Fish and Wildlife Service bought the northern portions of the marsh. It is managed by the U.S. Fish and Wildlife Service.

It is managed by the Wisconsin Department of Natural Resources (DNR). Millions of waterfowl, including over 200,000 Canada geese, migrate through the marsh.

The refuges are habitats for many species of birds, especially ducks, pelicans, great blue herons, and Canada geese (which have become increasingly common since the 1980s), as well as fish, frogs, snakes, turtles, muskrats, insects and plants.

Horicon Marsh was designated a Ramsar site on December 4, 1990.

Miscellaneous

In 1976, the brass band of Walden III Middle and High School in Racine, Wisconsin was named the Horicon Horns Band after school co-founder and co-Director Jackson Parker compared the new band's sound to the honking of geese at Horicon Marsh. The band would improve greatly over the years, and went on to become a staple of musical entertainment in Racine, even performing at the state capital for Kimberly Plache and at Disneyworld.

References

Facts About The Marsh Friends of Horicon Marsh

External links

 Horicon Marsh Wildlife Area - Wisconsin Department of Natural Resources
 Horicon National Wildlife Refuge - U.S. Fish and Wildlife Service
 Friends of Horicon Marsh Education and Visitor Center
 Enjoy Horicon Marsh - information about the Horicon Marsh and the communities that surround it

 Marsh Haven Nature Center is a 46-acre, non-profit, volunteer-supported visitor's center and park just across Hwy 49 from the northern edge of the Horicon National Wildlife Refuge. It is open to the public and has educational programs, picnic areas, and hiking trails. While not part of the Horicon National Wildlife Refuge or the Horicon Marsh State Wildlife Area, it is dedicated to the conservation and preservation of the same natural resources.
 

Marshes of Wisconsin
Glacial lakes of the United States
Lakes of Wisconsin
National Wildlife Refuges in Wisconsin
State Wildlife Areas of Wisconsin
Protected areas of Dodge County, Wisconsin
Protected areas of Fond du Lac County, Wisconsin
Ice Age National Scientific Reserve
Ramsar sites in the United States
Nature centers in Wisconsin
Landforms of Dodge County, Wisconsin
Landforms of Fond du Lac County, Wisconsin
1941 establishments in Wisconsin
Protected areas established in 1941